Eoin Francis Okorie McKeown (born 5 November 1998) is an English footballer who plays for  side Tamworth, where he plays as a forward.

He joined the Colchester United Academy from Hoddesdon Town following at trial with the club in 2015. He joined Isthmian League Division One North side Maldon & Tiptree on a work experience loan in December 2016 before he made his professional debut for Colchester in the EFL Trophy in August 2017. He rejoined Maldon & Tiptree on loan in January 2018 and then joined Wealdstone in an emergency loan deal in December 2018. After a loan spell with Welwyn Garden City, McKeown was released by Colchester in summer 2019. He later joined Kings Langley and then Wingate & Finchley.

Playing career

Colchester United
Born in Westminster, London, McKeown was playing for Hoddesdon Town when he was spotted by Colchester United scouts in 2015. Following a three-game trial with the Colchester United under-16 squad, he was offered a contract to join the club's Academy. He scored four goals against Queens Park Rangers under-18s in November 2015 during an 8–1 win.

In December 2016, Colchester under-23 assistant manager and Maldon & Tiptree manager Kevin Horlock signed McKeown on a work experience loan to the Isthmian League Division One North side. He made his debut on 10 December as an 86th-minute substitute against Cheshunt, helping set up the Jammers' fourth goal in a 4–1 victory. He scored his first goal on 21 January 2017 during a 2–0 win at home to Great Wakering Rovers. He made five league appearances for the club.

On 25 May 2017, McKeown signed a one-year professional development contract with Colchester.

McKeown made his Colchester debut on 29 August 2017 as a substitute for Tariq Issa against Reading U23 in the EFL Trophy. He scored in the 87th minute to level the score at 2–2 and take the match to a penalty shoot-out, which Colchester won 6–5.

He returned to Maldon & Tiptree on loan until the end of the season on 8 January 2018. He made his second club debut on 9 January in their 2–2 draw with Mildenhall Town. After almost three months out injured, he scored a hat-trick against Aveley in his third appearance of his loan spell on 14 April.

McKeown signed a new one-year contract with Colchester in May 2018.

In December 2018, McKeown joined National League South side Wealdstone in an emergency loan deal and made his debut in a 2–1 FA Trophy defeat to Biggleswade Town on 15 December. He scored his first goal for the club from the bench in the 92nd minute of Wealdstone's 1–1 draw with Dartford on 5 January 2019.

On 14 May 2019, it was announced McKeown was to leave Colchester United at the end of his contract.

Kings Langley
Since leaving Colchester, McKeown has played for Kings Langley and Wingate & Finchley.

Tamworth

On 4 February 2022, McKeown signed for Southern League Premier Division Central side Tamworth, moving the player closer to Loughborough, where he resides.  He made his debut on 5 February 2022 in an away Southern League Premier Division Central fixture against Stourbridge, with his new side being humbled 4-0.

McKeown was injured on his home debut for Tamworth on 12 February 2022 in a Southern League Premier Division Central match against Alvechurch, with McKeown being withdrawn on the 28th minute and replaced by Dexter Walters, the game finished 1-1.

McKeown returned to action on 15 March 2022, in an away Southern League Premier Division Central fixture against Leiston, coming on as a 65th minute substitute for Dexter Walters, the game also finished 1-1.

His first goal for Tamworth came on 26 March 2022, in a home Southern League Premier Division Central match against Needham Market, McKeown scored the opening goal in a 5-2 victory.

McKeown scored his second goal for Tamworth on 9 April 2022, in an away Southern League Premier Division Central fixture against lowly Lowestoft Town, netting on the 87th minute to give his team a share of the spoils with the match finishing 1-1.

McKeown bagged his first hattrick for Tamworth on 21 April 2022, in the penultimate Southern League Premier Division Central game of the season, in a rearranged home fixture against Biggleswade Town. McKeown scored the 13th, 31st and 45th minute to give the home side a 3-0 lead at the break.  The match finished 3-1, with the result being enough to relegate Biggleswade.

Career statistics

References

External links

1998 births
Living people
Footballers from Westminster
Association football forwards
Hoddesdon Town F.C. players
Colchester United F.C. players
Maldon & Tiptree F.C. players
Wealdstone F.C. players
Welwyn Garden City F.C. players
Kings Langley F.C. players
Wingate & Finchley F.C. players
Coggeshall Town F.C. players
Walton Casuals F.C. players
Loughborough University F.C. players
Braintree Town F.C. players
Tamworth F.C. players
Isthmian League players
Southern Football League players
National League (English football) players
English footballers